People with the surname Pottenger:

Carol M. Pottenger (born 1955), a Vice Admiral in the United States Navy
Francis M. Pottenger, Jr. (1901–1967), conducted what became known as the Pottenger Cat Study
Orville Pottenger (1921–1978), American football player and coach
Thomas Pottenger (1920–2003), former member of the Ohio House of Representatives 

Pottenger may also refer to:
Weston Price, the original name of the Price-Pottenger Nutrition Foundation (PPNF)